Kosoff is a surname. Notable people with the surname include:

Brian Kosoff (born 1957), American photographer 
Harold Kosoff (1930–1995), American inventor

See also
Kossoff